The Philly Pumptrack is a bicycle pump track within Fairmount Park, in the Parkside neighborhood of West Philadelphia. The pump track has separate beginner and expert sections.

History 
The Philly Pumptrack was created by Philadelphia cyclists Kenn Rymdeko, Heidi Grunwald, and Harlan Price. Planning began when Rymdeko, who is now the project manager, was the president of the Philadelphia Mountain Bike Association. The designer was Jim Dellavalle of Dellavalle Designs, whose previous work includes the Havemeyer Bike Park in Brooklyn. It opened on 10 May 2014. It was built with the help of the Bicycle Coalition of Greater Philadelphia and the Department of Parks and Recreation of the City of Philadelphia, which continues to assist in its operation.

The pump track was among the beneficiaries of an event that Pope Francis took part in during his 2015 visit to Philadelphia.

Events 
The Philly Pumptrack hosts events, including bike rodeos; bike swap meets; and races, such as the 2015 Poker Run, a fundraiser.

Gallery

References

External links 

 
 
 Philly Pumptrack at Dellavalle Designs

Sports venues in Philadelphia
West Fairmount Park
2014 establishments in Pennsylvania